Matthew Heilman is an American politician who is a member of the North Dakota House of Representatives, representing the 7th district. His district comprises part of Burleigh County.

Career 
Heilman graduated from Bismarck State College in North Dakota. Prior to his election, he served as precinct committeeman for the District 7 Republicans.

2022 General Election 
Heilman won the republican primary with 34.7% of the vote. He won the general election unopposed.

Political positions

Education policy
Heilman supports House Bill 1494 aimed at making school meals more accessible to students.

Gun rights
Heilman introduced a bill to allow university students to carry weapons on campus, stating, "If [students] were carrying, it would be a great deterrent for people who want to commit violent acts against them".

Immigration
Heilman opposes sanctuary cities, supporting a bill that would ban then in North Dakota. He stated that this was a proactive measure to prevent the "utter disarray" seen at the southern border from coming to North Dakota.

Personal life 
Heilman is an eagle scout.

References 

Living people
Republican Party members of the North Dakota House of Representatives
21st-century American politicians
American Roman Catholics